San Pedro River is a river in the southwest of Camagüey Province, Cuba.  Its basin covers an area of 1,053 km2.  The watershed is polluted due to the discharge of poorly treated liquid waste from the city of Camagüey.  Home to Jimaguayú Dam, one of the largest in the country.

The river forms south of the city of Camagüey, at the confluence of Río Tínima and Río Hatibonico.  River El Bolsillo  joins it just south of the confluence.  San Pedro River flows south to Jimaguayú Dam, then west, and empties into the Caribbean Sea about 40 km west of town of Vertientes.

See also
List of rivers of Cuba

References

Rivers of Cuba